The John M. Armstrong House is in Saint Paul, Minnesota, United States. John Milton Armstrong, son of John Armstrong, Jr. (April 20, 1793 – December 22, 1865) hired architect Edward P. Bassford to design this side-by-side duplex in 1886 as income-producing residential housing. The red brick house was originally located at 233-235 West Fifth Street, but was moved to its present location on Eagle Parkway in November 2001.

References

Houses completed in 1886
Houses in Saint Paul, Minnesota
Houses on the National Register of Historic Places in Minnesota
National Register of Historic Places in Saint Paul, Minnesota
Queen Anne architecture in Minnesota
Relocated buildings and structures in Minnesota